The 2000 Kawartha Lakes municipal election was held on November 13, 2000, to elect a mayor, councillors, and school trustees in the city of Kawartha Lakes, Ontario, Canada.

Results

{| style="width:475px;" class="wikitable"
|+ 2000 Kawartha Lakes election, Councillor, Ward Nine
|- bgcolor="#EEEEEE"
! align="left" | Candidate
! align="right" | Total votes
! align="right" | % of total votes
|-
| align="left" | Sal Polito
| align="right" | 1,272
| align="right" | 54.90
|-
| align="left" | Jerry Ford
| align="right" | 1,045
| align="right" | 45.10
|-  bgcolor="#EEEEEE"
! align="left" | Total valid votes
! align="right" | 2,317'! align="right" | 100.00|}Lloyd Ashmore''' (died September 30, 2004) was a beef farmer and veteran municipal politician in central Ontario. He was first elected as one of four councillors in Emily Township, Ontario in the early 1950s, receiving 331 votes and earning ninety-two dollars for his first year of public service. He served in municipal politics on and off until his death, and was at different times Emily's reeve and deputy reeve. He supported the community's amalgamation into Kawartha Lakes in 2000. The 2000 election was his last campaign; he did not seek re-election in 2003. Ashmore was known for his gentle demeanour and his encyclopedic knowledge of local politics. He died at age eighty-four after collapsing in his barn, after either a heart attack or dizzy spell. His memorial service was at the Cambridge Street United Church in Lindsay. His daughter, Mary Smith, is also a municipal politician.Source: "Election Results," Lindsay Daily Post, 15 November 2000, p. 3.''

References

2000 Ontario municipal elections